Pelle Tobias Kil (born 26 May 1971) is a cyclist from the Netherlands. He competed in the men's team time trial at the 1992 Summer Olympics, finishing 9th. He finished third in the Dutch National Time Trial Championships in 1993.

See also
 List of Dutch Olympic cyclists
 List of people from Amsterdam

References

1971 births
Living people
Dutch male cyclists
Olympic cyclists of the Netherlands
Cyclists at the 1992 Summer Olympics
Cyclists from Amsterdam